The Grand Hyatt San Francisco is a skyscraper hotel located half a block north of Union Square in San Francisco, California. The 36-storey, 660 room  tower was completed in 1972, as the Hyatt on Union Square and renamed the Grand Hyatt San Francisco in 1990.

The hotel had 402 employees before the COVID-19 pandemic, dropping to  28 as of April 2021, mainly due to cancelled conventions in the city. It was closed for around half of 2020, losing about $1 million per day during that time.

Ruth Asawa's San Francisco Fountain

A fountain by Ruth Asawa is located outside the Grand Hyatt. The basin is made of bronze and has a bas-relief with scenes of San Francisco.

See also

 San Francisco's tallest buildings

References

External links

 Grand Hyatt San Francisco website
 Hotel Hotels - Grand Hyatt SF

Skyscraper hotels in San Francisco
Hyatt Hotels and Resorts
Union Square, San Francisco
Hotel buildings completed in 1972
Hotels established in 1972
1972 establishments in California